Quinn L. Cummings (born August 13, 1967) is an American entrepreneur, author, humorist, inventor and former actress.

Cummings came to prominence as a child actor, playing Lucy McFadden in Neil Simon's The Goodbye Girl, for which she was nominated for an Academy Award for Best Supporting Actress, as well as a recurring role as Annie Cooper on the television series Family. Since quitting acting, she has become an entrepreneur, and has authored several books.

Early life 
Cummings was born in Los Angeles. Her father, Sumner, was a businessman who died when she was still a child. Her mother, Jan, was a bookkeeper.

Career

Film and television
Cummings began her career after being discovered by cinematographer James Wong Howe. She soon began landing roles in numerous television commercials, eventually winning the role of Marsha Mason's daughter, Lucy McFadden, in the 1977 film The Goodbye Girl. Cummings' performance was nominated for an Academy Award for Best Supporting Actress and a Golden Globe Award for Best Supporting Actress – Motion Picture.

In 1978, Cummings had a recurring role on the drama series Family. In 1985, Cummings appeared in the short-lived ABC sitcom Hail to the Chief as the daughter of the first female president of the United States, played by Patty Duke. During the late 1980s, Cummings acted occasionally and worked as a casting agent. She attended UCLA for two years and had a stint recruiting writers to publish short stories online. Her last acting role was a 1991 episode of Blossom.

Other ventures 
Inspired by the birth of her daughter, Cummings created the HipHugger, a sling-type device for carrying a baby. She was the president of the HipHugger company before selling it in 2006.

In February 2005, Cummings started a blog, The QC Report, which discussed the ironies of modern life from the point of view of a career mother in her 30s.

Cummings' first book, Notes from the Underwire: Adventures from My Awkward and Lovely Life, was published in July 2009. Her second book, The Year of Learning Dangerously, which explores the current state of home schooling in America, was published by Perigee Books in August 2012. Pet Sounds, a collection of humorous stories relating to animals and pet ownership was released in the summer of 2013. In 2019, she launched a podcast: "Quinn Cummings Gives Bad Advice" in which she responds to listener questions on any advice topic, highlighting the fact that she has no particular knowledge or expertise in the subject being raised.

Cummings made statements and wrote an article in 2017 about sexual harassment abuse in Hollywood, particularly abuse of children in the industry.

In 2021, Cummings self-published a book, Modest Blessings for Modern Times. The book is a humorous collection of scenarios where the reader might feel "modestly" grateful if such a scenario happened. (Example: "You shower after a teenage boy, and yet there is still hot water.") Cummings has donated a portion of proceeds from the book to various non-profit organizations.

Personal life 
In 2000, Cummings gave birth to a daughter, Anneke DiPietro, by her partner Donald DiPietro.

Filmography 
The Goodbye Girl (1977)
Listen to Me (1989)

Television
Big Eddie (Unknown episodes, 1975)
Jeremiah of Jacob's Neck (1976)
The Six Million Dollar Man (1 episode, 1976)
Night Terror (1977)
Visions (1 episode, 1977)
Intimate Strangers (1977)
Starsky and Hutch (1 episode, 1978)
Baretta (1 episode, 1978)
CBS Library (1 episode – The Incredible Book Escape, 1980)
Family (36 episodes, 1978–1980)
The Babysitter (1980)
Darkroom (1 episode, 1981)
Grandpa, Will You Run with Me? (1983)
Remington Steele (1 episode, 1984)
Hail to the Chief (Unknown episodes, 1985)
The Love Boat (1 episode, 1986)
Blossom (1 episode, 1991)

Bibliography 
 Notes from the Underwire: Adventures from My Awkward and Lovely Life (2009)
 The Year of Learning Dangerously (2012)
 Pet Sounds (2013)
 Modest Blessings for Modern Times (2021)

Awards and nominations
Academy Award
Nominated: Best Actress in a Supporting Role, The Goodbye Girl (1978)

Golden Globe
Nominated: Best Motion Picture Actress in a Supporting Role, The Goodbye Girl (1978)

Young Artist Award
Nominated: Best Juvenile Actress in a TV Series or Special, Family (1980)
Won: Best Young Actress in a Television Series, Family (1981)
Nominated: Best Young Actress in a Movie Made for Television, Grandpa, Will You Run with Me? (1984)

References

External links
 Quinn Tries Standup
 
 

1967 births
Living people
20th-century American actresses
21st-century American businesspeople
21st-century American businesswomen
21st-century American inventors
21st-century American women writers
Actresses from Los Angeles
American bloggers
American child actresses
American film actresses
American humorists
American podcasters
American television actresses
American women bloggers
American women non-fiction writers
American women podcasters
People from Greater Los Angeles
University of California, Los Angeles alumni
Women humorists
Women inventors
Writers from Los Angeles